Sports Car Championship Canada (SCCC), currently known as the Sports Car Championship Canada presented by Michelin for sponsorship reasons, is a Canadian professional sports car racing series organized by FEL Motorsports. Founded in 2021, the series was created as a competitor to the established Canadian Touring Car Championship series.

Format
Each season consists of twelve total rounds of racing. Starting in the 2023 season, the series will run a condensed schedule with four total events consisting of three 40-minute sprint races at each stop.

Classes
There are two classes in the Sports Car Championship Canada series, featuring one grand tourer and one touring car classes:

GT4
TCR
TCA

The inaugural season only featured the GT4 and TCR classes, though the organizers did not own the TCR license for Canada at the time. FEL Motorsports obtained the Canadian organization license for TCR competitions from the World Sporting Consulting (WSC) prior to the 2022 season.

In October 2022, FEL Motorsports announced the addition of the TCA class for the 2023 season.

Circuits

Champions

See also
 Canadian Touring Car Championship
 IMSA SportsCar Championship
 Blancpain GT World Challenge America

References

External links
Sports Car Championship Canada official website

Canada
Auto racing series in Canada
Motorsport in Canada
Recurring sporting events established in 2021
Canada
Canada